Set My Heart on Fire Immediately is the fifth studio album by American musician Perfume Genius, released May 15, 2020 through Matador Records as the follow up to 2017's No Shape. The album received critical acclaim upon release, with some critics calling it Hadreas' best work to date, praising its exploration of queer themes and homages to 80s pop and classic rock music.

Set My Heart on Fire Immediately is an art rock and pop album that features elements of baroque pop, art pop, synthpop, funk, alt-pop, shoegaze, ambient, psychedelic, R&B, acoustic pop, disco, swamp rock, chamber, doo-wop, industrial, and heartland rock.

Background
In an interview with Jia Tolentino, Mike Hadreas described the album as influenced by his work with choreographer Kate Wallich on a 2019 dance piece titled "The Sun Still Burns Here". Hadreas composed numerous songs for the performance, with two singles, "Eye in the Wall" and "Pop Song" resulting, though neither was included on Set My Heart on Fire Immediately. Of the experience, Hadreas explained that the themes of embodiment in his prior music were complicated as dance felt "rebellious against [his] body." He explained that dancing "blew up this separation between [his] work and the world," resulting in changes to his songwriting, with songs now telling stories grounded in real-life settings and about real people. He cited Townes Van Zandt, Enya, and Cocteau Twins as influences on the new album.

Critical reception

Set My Heart on Fire Immediately received rave reviews. At review aggregator Metacritic, which assigns a normalized rating out of 100 to reviews from critics, the album received a weighted average score of 91 out of 100, based on 25 reviews, indicating "universal acclaim" and making it Perfume Genius' highest rated album on the website.

Accolades

Track listing

Personnel
Musicians
 Mike Hadreas – vocals (all tracks), synthesizers (1, 2, 5, 7, 10, 12, 13), Wurlitzer (4)
 Blake Mills – guitar (1–3, 7–9, 11, 12), bass (1, 3, 4, 7, 9, 11), synthesizers (1, 4, 8, 10, 12, 13), drums (1), glockenspiel (1), synth guitar (6, 11), harmony vocals (6, 10, 11), organ (8, 10), piano (11, 12), synth drums (12), harmonium (13)
 Matt Chamberlain – additional drums (1), drums (4, 6, 7, 10, 12)
 Rob Moose – violin (1, 3–5, 9, 13), viola (1, 3–5, 9, 13)
 Alan Wyffels – piano (1, 12), organ (3, 9), harpsichord (4), synthesizers (5, 8, 12), harmony vocals (7), flute (8), Wurlitzer (12), Rhodes (13)
 Jim Keltner – drums (2, 3, 9, 11)
 Pino Palladino – bass (2, 6, 7)
 Gabriel Cabezas – cello (3, 4, 9, 13)
 Sam Gendel – synthesizers (4), saxophone (7, 8, 12), synth drums (7), drum machine (7, 10)
 Phoebe Bridgers – harmony vocals (6)
 Ethan Gruska – harmony vocals (6), vocals (6), percussion (6)

Engineers
 Blake Mills – production
 Joseph Lorge – engineering
 Greg Koller – engineering, mixing
 Patricia Sullivan – mastering
 Ian Sefchick – mastering

Artwork
 Camille Vivier – photographs
 Andrew J. S. – art direction

Charts

Remix album 

A remix album, titled IMMEDIATELY Remixes, was announced on January 14, 2021. It was initially announced for release on February 19, 2021, however it was delayed until March 12, 2021. It received a limited vinyl release for Record Store Day 2021.

It was preceded by the singles, "On the Floor (Initial Talk Remix)", "Without You (Jim-E Stack Remix)", "Your Body Changes Everything (Boy Harsher Remix)", and "Describe (A. G. Cook Remix)", released April 29, 2020, December 3, 2020, January 14, 2021, and March 3, 2021, respectively.

Track listing

References

2020 albums
Perfume Genius albums
Matador Records albums
Albums produced by Blake Mills